Jacob Nilsen Hoel (7 August 1775 – 29 July 1847) was a Norwegian farmer, officer and politician.

References

1775 births
1847 deaths
Norwegian Army personnel
Norwegian military personnel of the Napoleonic Wars
Norwegian politicians